Dolores Heredia Lerma (born October 6, 1966) is a Mexican actress.

Personal life

She is the seventh of ten children who grew up in La Paz, Baja California Sur. Her mother was a photographer from Sinaloa, Lusiana Kornal and her father was a seaman from Guanajuato. She studied drama at the National Autonomous University of Mexico.

Filmography

Movies
The Day of the Lord (2020) - Marisa
Chicuarotes (2019) - Tonchi
Sonora (2018) - Doña Rosario
Two Men in Town (2014) - Teresa Flores
Bless Me, Ultima (2013) - Maria
El Santos vs. La Tetona Mendoza (2012)
Get the Gringo (2012)- Kid's Mom
A Better Life (2011) - Anita
180° (2010) 
Días de gracia (2010)
Rock Marí (2009) 
El horno (2009) 
The Desert Within (2008) - Maria Dolores
Rudo y Cursi (2008) - Elvira
Purgatorio (2008/I)  
Conozca la cabeza de Juan Pérez (2008) 
Enemigos íntimos (2008) 
El viaje de Teo (2008) 
Vantage Point (2008) 
Tr3s (2007) 
Al final del día (2007) 
Cobrador: In God We Trust (2006) 
La mirada del adiós (2006) 
Mujer alabastrina (2006) 
Fuera del cielo (2006) - Sara
Sexo, amor y otras perversiones 2 (2006) 
La historia del baúl rosado (2005) 
La mudanza (2003) 
Suertuda gloria (2003) 
Ciudades oscuras (2002) 
De la calle (2001) 
Santitos (1999) 
En el aire (1995) 
Dos crímenes (1995) 
Desiertos mares (1995)  
Un pedazo de noche (1995) 
Un hilito de sangre (1995)  
La hija del Puma (1994) 
Vagabunda (1994) 
Pueblo viejo (1993) 
Decisiones (1993) 
De barro (1992) 
El patrullero (1991) 
Sombra de ángel (1991) 
Un cielo cruel y una tierra colorada (1991) 
Pueblo de madera (1990) 
La otra orilla (1990)

Television
 Diablero (2018) - Mamá Chabela
Sense8 (2016)
La ruta blanca (2012) 
Deseo prohibido (2008) 
Capadocia (2008) - Teresa Lagos
Marina (2006) - Rosa
Mujeres (2005) 
Gitanas (2004) - Jovanka
The Wrong Man (1993) - Rosita

Accolades
Amiens International Film Festival, Best Actress, "Santitos", 1999
Ariel Award, nomination, "Santitos", 1999
Ariel Award, nomination, "Dos crímenes", 1995
Cartagena Film Festival, Best Actress, "Santitos", 1999
Guadalajara Mexican Film Festival, Best Actress, "Conozca la cabeza de Juan Pérez", 2008

External links

  Information

1966 births
Living people
People from La Paz, Baja California Sur
Mexican film actresses
Mexican television actresses
Mexican telenovela actresses
National Autonomous University of Mexico alumni
20th-century Mexican actresses
21st-century Mexican actresses